Prexeca Bangers is a Brazilian hip hop group formed in 2004 in Rio de Janeiro, Brazil, by the MC's Rodrigo "Fox" Raposo and Vitor "Mãe" Castro. In 2011 Prexeca Bangers released his first music video for the single "Tem muleh" to promote his album "Strondando a Porra Toda" which was released shortly after.

History
Prexeca Bangers was formed in 2004 in Rio de Janeiro. They recorded several songs quickly becoming known on the internet, with a new musical style called "Stronda Music". They released their first studio album in 2009.

Prexeca Bangers released in late 2010 his single "Samurai Kama-sutra" to promote his second album, Strondando a Porra Toda. On August 23, 2011 Prexeca Bangers released  his first music video for the single "Tem muleh", part of the album "Strondando a Porra Toda" which was released shortly after.

On January 5, 2012 they released the singles "Maconheira do Amor" and "Fugi do Hospicio" to promete the album "Hits de Verão" which was released on February 4, 2013. Prexeca Bangers has announced a new album this year titled "Piratão de Inverno" without an specifying a release date.

Discography

Albums
 Prexeca Bangers (2009)
 Strondando a Porra toda (2011)
 Hitś de Verão (2013)
 Piratão de Inverno (2013) (unreleased)

Singles
 Samurai do Kama sutra (2010)
 Tem muleh (2011)
 Maconheira do Amor (2012)
 Fugi do Hospicio (2012)

Music videos
 Tem Muleh (2011)

References

External links 
Multishow, Prexeca Bangers vamo Strondar 
Prexeca Bangers, Som 13 
TramaVirtual - Prexeca Bangers 

Brazilian hip hop groups
Musical groups established in 2004